Shi Wei may refer to:

 Shi Wei (handballer) (born 1970), Chinese handball player
 Wei Shyy, President of the Hong Kong University of Science and Technology
 Chen Xuezhao, pen name Shi Wei

See also
 Shiwei (disambiguation)